Miss America 1939, the 13th Miss America pageant, was the last pageant to be held at the famed Steel Pier in Atlantic City, New Jersey. The finals were held on Saturday, September 9, 1939, and Miss Michigan, Patricia Donnelly, was crowned Miss America 1939. The Miss Congeniality Award was also introduced at the 1939 competition.

Donnelly later became a singer and actress. Third runner-up Marguerita Skliris became the actress Margia Dean, who starred in such Hollywood films as Seven Women from Hell and The Quatermass Xperiment. Fourth runner-up Rose Marie Elliott had a successful musical career on the Broadway stage as Rose Marie Brown.

Results

Awards

Preliminary awards

Other awards

Contestants

References

Secondary sources

External links
 Miss America official website

1939
1939 in the United States
1939 in New Jersey
September 1939 events
Events in Atlantic City, New Jersey